Thaddeus Campbell Sweet (November 16, 1872 – May 1, 1928) was an American manufacturer and politician from New York. He represented New York's 32nd congressional district from 1923 to 1928.

Biography
He was born on November 16, 1872 in Phoenix, New York to Anthony Wayne Sweet and Sarah Elizabeth Campbell. He attended the public schools, and graduated from Phoenix Academy and High School. Then he entered business and for two years served as a traveling salesman. In 1895, he began the manufacture of paper and was President of the Sweet Paper Manufacturing Co. He also engaged in banking. He was town clerk of Phoenix from 1896 to 1899.

He was a member of the New York State Assembly (Oswego Co.) in 1910, 1911, 1912, 1913, 1914, 1915, 1916, 1917, 1918, 1919 and 1920; and was Speaker from 1914 to 1920. As Speaker, in 1919 Sweet opposed the protective labor legislation for women and children promoted by newly enfranchised New York women, refusing to allow it to get to the Assembly floor.  That fall, suffragist Marion Dickerman fought a tough race to defeat his bid for reelection, and though she lost she cut substantially into his support and, for the first time in his political career, made him work hard to win. Suffragists believed Dickerman's race quashed his gubernatorial chances. In 1920 he proposed the infamous expulsion of socialists from the New York Assembly.

He was a delegate to the 1916 and 1924 Republican National Conventions.

He was elected to the 68th United States Congress in 1923 to fill the vacancy caused by the death of Luther W. Mott and served from November 6, 1923 until his death in office, having been re-elected to the 69th and 70th United States Congresses.

Death
Thaddeus Sweet was the first sitting member of Congress to die in an airplane accident. Shortly after breakfast on May 1, 1928, he and the pilot Lt. Bushrod Hoppin, U.S. Army, took off in a new Army observation plane, Curtiss O-1B Falcon, serial number 27-279, assigned at Middletown Air Depot, Pennsylvania, from Bolling Field to fly to Oswego, New York, where he was to make a speech. Lt. Hoppin, known as a careful pilot, flew into a storm between Binghamton, New York and Cortland, New York.

He thought it best to land and selected a field on a stock farm near Whitney Point, New York. The field was knobbly, and the airplane bounced and turned a somersault. Sweet, having unbuckled his safety belt, was pitched against the cockpit wall, and killed by a head injury. Lt. Hoppin, belted in his seat, was unbruised. Sweet was buried at the Rural Cemetery at Phoenix, New York.

Legacy
The Sweet Memorial Building was dedicated to him in 1929.  It was listed on the National Register of Historic Places in 1990.

See also
List of United States Congress members who died in office (1900–49)

References

External links 

 

Victims of aviation accidents or incidents in the United States
1872 births
1928 deaths
Speakers of the New York State Assembly
Accidental deaths in New York (state)
Republican Party members of the United States House of Representatives from New York (state)
People from Phoenix, New York
Victims of aviation accidents or incidents in 1928